Andrea Star Reese (born March 14, 1952, in Milwaukee) is a documentary photographer and photojournalist based in New York City who has done work in Indonesia as well as the United States. Her BFA and MFA are from the California Institute of the Arts school of Film/Video and she graduated from the International Center of Photography's Documentary Photography and Photojournalism program.

References

External links 
Andrea Star Reese home page

California Institute of the Arts alumni
Artists from Milwaukee
American photojournalists
Social documentary photographers
American women photographers
1952 births
Living people
21st-century American women
Women photojournalists